Same-sex marriage in Indiana has been legally recognized since October 6, 2014. The state had previously restricted marriage to different-sex couples by statute in 1986. By legislation passed in 1997, it denied recognition to same-sex relationships established in other jurisdictions. A lawsuit challenging the state's refusal to grant marriage licenses to same-sex couples, Baskin v. Bogan, won a favorable ruling from the U.S. District Court for the Southern District of Indiana on June 25, 2014. Until the Seventh Circuit Court of Appeals granted an emergency stay of the district court's ruling on June 27, most Indiana counties issued marriage licenses to same-sex couples. The Seventh Circuit affirmed the district court's ruling in Baskin on September 4. A ruling in Bowling v. Pence stated that the state must recognize same-sex marriages performed out-of-state and the decision was stayed until the Seventh Circuit ruled on the merits in similar cases. It also stated that the ruling would remain stayed if the circuit court stayed its decision in the related cases.

The U.S. Supreme Court declined to consider an appeal in Baskin v. Bogan on October 6, which allowed the Seventh Circuit Court of Appeals to implement its decision requiring Indiana to license and recognize same-sex marriages.

Legal history

Statutory restrictions
Indiana passed a same-sex marriage ban in 1986. A law enacted in 1997 forbade the recognition of same-sex marriages established in jurisdictions outside Indiana.

On November 26, 2012, Indiana Equality Action published a study researched by law students from the LGBT Project at the Indiana University Maurer School of Law titled "More Than Just a Couple: 614 Reasons Why Marriage Equality Matters in Indiana." The study detailed the rights and responsibilities of civil marriage found in 614 laws in the Indiana Code. It said that these laws show that marriage discrimination in the state not only denies many legal rights to same-sex couples but also denies the public protection from conflicts of interest from activities that are prohibited for opposite-sex married couples but not for same-sex couples.

In January 2017, Representative Jim Lucas introduced a bill removing the state's same-sex marriage ban and replacing references to "husband and wife" with the gender-neutral term "spouses". The bill was assigned to the House Judiciary Committee on January 9, 2017, but was not heard in committee. A similar bill was introduced in January 2023 by Senator Andrea Hunley.

Constitutional amendment proposals
Since 2004, there have been several efforts on behalf of a constitutional amendment banning same-sex marriage in Indiana; none of which have been successful. In 2010, such a proposal passed the Indiana Senate in a 38–10 vote, but the House of Representatives, which had a Democratic majority, took no action, failing even to schedule a hearing on the legislation.

In 2011, a similar proposal passed the House 70–26 and the Senate 40–10. The text adopted was:

The approval of an identical amendment by both chambers during the 2013-2014 legislative session was required to place the amendment on the state ballot in November 2014. In December 2012, Governor Mitch Daniels, without taking a position on the proposed amendment, said that business leaders had expressed concern that it would restrict their policies toward same-sex couples. He said: "They wouldn't want their ability to offer benefits and that sort of thing limited. They think it's fair. They think it's important at least in case of some of their employees." On October 28, 2013, Indiana University announced its opposition to the proposed amendment. In November 2013, legislative leaders announced that the General Assembly would address the amendment in its next session. House Speaker Brian Bosma, a proponent of the measure, said that "This is not the most important issue facing us by far. We have to deal with the issue with dignity and respect... and bring this 12-year discussion to a conclusion." On December 4, the six Roman Catholic bishops of Indiana issued a statement that, without referencing the legislation, reiterated their position that marriage is "the intimate communion of life and love between one man and one woman."

The language of the joint resolution was introduced in the 2014 legislative session as HJR3 on January 9. A companion bill was also introduced that provided clarifying language directing that the proposed constitutional amendment would ban same-sex marriages and civil unions but not domestic partnerships. Bosma said it was aimed at reassuring universities and localities that the benefits they provide employees under the designation "domestic partners" would not be affected by the adoption of the constitutional amendment, though other lawmakers disputed whether the language of the bill, if adopted, could control the interpretation of the constitutional amendment. The House Judiciary Committee held a hearing on the proposed amendment on January 13, but took no vote. On January 21, Bosma moved the proposed amendment to the Elections and Apportionment Committee. On January 22, that committee approved the proposed amendment by a vote of 9 to 3 with one absence. On January 27, the Indiana House voted 52–43, with 29 Democrats and 23 Republicans in favor, to remove the second sentence, which would have banned civil unions, from the amendment. On January 28, the House approved the shortened version in a 57–40 vote. On February 10, the Senate Rules Committee approved the identical one-sentence version in an 8–4 vote, and the Senate approved that version in a 32–17 vote on February 17. The text adopted was:

As the text of the amendment had been modified, approval in the 2015-2016 session was required in order to place the measure on the ballot. However, the General Assembly took no further action on the amendment and it was never placed on the ballot.

Lawsuits

State lawsuits
A lawsuit, Morrison v. Sadler, brought in 2002 by the American Civil Liberties Union (ACLU) on behalf of 3 same-sex couples seeking marriage rights and challenging a 1986 law that limited marriages to opposite-sex couples failed in the Marion County Superior Court in May 2003. The judge ruled that restricting marriage to different-sex couples "promotes the state's interest in encouraging procreation to occur in a context where both biological parents are present to raise the child." Two of the couples had formed civil unions in Vermont in 2000. The ruling was upheld by the Indiana Court of Appeals on January 20, 2005. After the ruling by the Court of Appeals in January 2005, when the third couple had formed a Vermont civil union and one couple had married in Canada as well, the plaintiffs decided not to appeal to the Indiana Supreme Court to avoid a negative outcome there that might influence other state courts.

On December 23, 2013, the Indiana Court of Appeals ruled in In Re: Marriage of Melanie Davis that Indiana's law banning same-sex marriage could not be used to invalidate a marriage if one spouse later changes their legal gender.

Federal lawsuits
Five same-sex marriage lawsuits were filed in the U.S. District Court for the Southern District of Indiana in March 2014:
Love v. Pence, Baskin v. Bogan, Fujii v. Pence, Bowling v. Pence, and Lee v. Pence.

Baskin v. Bogan

Baskin v. Bogan was filed in the Southern District of Indiana on March 14, 2014 by Lambda Legal on behalf of two same-sex couples, all women. The defendants were the Indiana Attorney General, Greg Zoeller, and three county clerks, with one of the county clerks, Penny Bogan, in her official capacity, as the first-named defendant. It took precedence over the other Indiana marriage cases, because one of the plaintiffs was terminally ill with ovarian cancer, though the case of her and her partner was soon separated from that of the other plaintiffs. On June 25, 2014, Judge Richard L. Young ruled with respect to the remaining plaintiffs in Baskin, as well as the cases of Fujii and Lee. He found in favor of the plaintiff couples, granted them summary judgment and struck down Indiana's ban on same-sex marriage. He also removed Governor Mike Pence from the lawsuit. He issued no stay and Indiana clerks began issuing marriage licenses to same-sex couples the day of the ruling. The first couple to receive a license were Craig Bowen and Jake Miller in Indianapolis on June 25. The Seventh Circuit brought license issuance to a halt on June 27.

The Seventh Circuit Court of Appeals consolidated Baskin and its companion cases with a similar case in Wisconsin, Wolf v. Walker. It heard oral arguments on August 26. On September 4, the Seventh Circuit, in a unanimous opinion authored by Judge Richard Posner, upheld the district court's decision. On September 9, 2014, Wisconsin (joint by Indiana) asked the U.S. Supreme Court to uphold their respective bans on same-sex marriage. On September 15, the Seventh Circuit granted a motion for a stay of ruling, to be in effect until the case is resolved at the Supreme Court. The U.S. Supreme Court declined to consider an appeal in Baskin on October 6, 2014, which allowed the Seventh Circuit Court of Appeals to implement its decision requiring Indiana to license and recognize same-sex marriages, effectively legalizing same-sex marriage in Indiana.

Love v. Pence
Love v. Pence was filed on March 7, 2014. Judge Young dismissed it for lack of subject-matter jurisdiction on June 25, 2014, because the only named defendant was Governor Pence, who cannot, he wrote, "issue executive decrees telling other elected officials how to do their jobs when it comes to laws affecting marriage." Judge Young reinstated that part of the suit concerned with the recognition of marriages from other jurisdictions on September 16, citing Governor Pence's memos directing state officials how to respond to other court decisions on the issue of same-sex marriage.

Bowling v. Pence
The plaintiffs in Bowling v. Pence raised only the question of Indiana's recognition of same-sex marriages from other jurisdictions, not the state's refusal to grant marriage licenses to same-sex couples. One plaintiff couple was married in Iowa in 2011. A third plaintiff sought to dissolve her marriage established elsewhere. Judge Young issued his ruling in Bowling v. Pence on August 19, repeating the logic of his earlier decision in finding that the state's refusal to recognize same-sex marriages was unconstitutional. Though he had previously dismissed Love v. Pence after accepting the arguments of Governor Pence that the Governor of Indiana lacked authority over the enforcement of the state's ban, Young reversed himself, citing actions Pence took following the decision to Baskin. Young noted that Pence, contrary to his earlier claims, had issued memos to state agencies instructing them to disregard the July 25 decision in Baskin. Pence had written on July 7 that Indiana's ban "is in full force and effect and executive branch agencies are to execute their functions as though the U.S. District Court Order of June 25, 2014 had not been issued." In his Bowling decision, Young wrote: "The memoranda issued by the Governor clearly contradict his prior representations to the court". He called Pence's earlier statements a "bold misrepresentation". He wrote that his acceptance of Pence as defendant "is not based on the Governor's general duty to enforce the laws. It is based on his specific ability to command the executive branch regarding the law." He commented: "The court, after witnessing the Governor do what he claimed he could not do, reverses course and finds him to be a proper party to such lawsuits. The court wishes to reiterate that it finds the Governor's prior representations contradicting such authority to be, at a minimum, troubling." Young stayed enforcement of his decision and the state announced plans to appeal on August 21.

The ruling was stayed until the Seventh Circuit ruled on the merits in similar cases. It also stated that the ruling would remain stayed if the Seventh Circuit stayed its decision in the related cases. The state's appeal was dismissed on January 5, 2015.

Developments after legalization
The U.S. Supreme Court ruled in Obergefell v. Hodges on June 26, 2015 that same-sex couples have a constitutional right to marry under the Due Process and Equal Protection clauses of the Fourteenth Amendment, legalizing same-sex marriage nationwide in the United States. Indiana statutes have yet to be modified to reflect legalization, with various unenforceable and void provisions still referring to marriage as being a heterosexual union. In January 2020, a bill to ban child marriage was the source of a "political fight" concerning the same-sex marriage provisions. The bill would have raised the minimum age of marriage from 15 to 18. According to the Associated Press, a House committee voted 9–1 in favor of the bill "after hearing from women who testified they were 15 or 16 when their parents forced them to marry men who had raped or molested them and then faced more abuse before being able to escape the relationship". After Representative Matt Pierce introduced an amendment to remove the unconstitutional sections banning same-sex marriage, House Speaker Brian Bosma refused to call the bill to the floor. In March 2020, a bill banning child marriage passed the House and Senate, but without the same-sex marriage amendment.

Marriage statistics
The following table, based on data published annually by the Indiana State Department of Health, shows the number of marriages performed in Indiana.

Public opinion
{| class="wikitable"
|+style="font-size:100%" | Public opinion for same-sex marriage in Indiana
|-
! style="width:190px;"| Poll source
! style="width:200px;"| Date(s)administered
! class=small | Samplesize
! Margin oferror
! style="width:100px;"| % support
! style="width:100px;"| % opposition
! style="width:40px;"| % no opinion
|-
| Public Religion Research Institute
| align=center| March 8–November 9, 2021
| align=center| ?
| align=center| ?
|  align=center| 65%
| align=center| 32%
| align=center| 3%
|-
| Public Religion Research Institute
| align=center| January 7–December 20, 2020
| align=center| 1,083 random telephoneinterviewees
| align=center| ?
|  align=center| 62%
| align=center| 33%
| align=center| 5%
|-
| Public Religion Research Institute
| align=center| April 5–December 23, 2017
| align=center| 1,531 random telephoneinterviewees
| align=center| ?
|  align=center| 58%
| align=center| 34%
| align=center| 8%
|-
| Public Religion Research Institute
| align=center| May 18, 2016–January 10, 2017
| align=center| 2,288 random telephoneinterviewees
| align=center| ?
|  align=center| 53%
| align=center| 38%
| align=center| 9%
|-
| Public Religion Research Institute
| align=center| April 29, 2015–January 7, 2016
| align=center| 1,938 random telephoneinterviewees
| align=center| ?
|  align=center| 52%
| align=center| 38%
| align=center| 10%
|-
| New York Times/CBS News/YouGov
| align=center| September 20–October 1, 2014
| align=center| 1,405 likely voters
| align=center| ± 3.1%
| align=center| 43%
|  align=center| 45%
| align=center| 12%
|-
| rowspan=2 colspan=1 |Princeton Survey Research International
| rowspan=2 colspan=1 align=center | October 8–21, 2013
| align=center| 600 interviews
| align=center| ± 4.8%
|  align=center| 48%
| align=center| 46%
| align=center| 6%
|-
| align=center| ? likely voters
| align=center| ?
| align=center| 44%
|  align=center| 48%
| align=center| 8%
|-
| Bowen Center for Public Affairs
| align=center| November 12–24, 2012
| align=center| 602 adults
| align=center| ± 4.5%
| align=center| 45%
| align=center| 45%
| align=center| 10%
|-

See also
LGBT rights in Indiana
Same-sex marriage in the United States

References

External links
"More Than Just a Couple: 614 Reasons Why Marriage Equality Matters in Indiana (A Compendium of the Rights and Responsibilities of Civil Marriage in the Indiana Code)", Indiana Equality Action/Indiana University Maurer School of Law Report
 

LGBT rights in Indiana
Indiana
2014 in LGBT history
2014 in Indiana